James Mwewa Spaita (April 8, 1934 – November 4, 2014) was a Roman Catholic archbishop, born in Bombwe.

Ordained to the priesthood on September 9, 1962, Spaita was named bishop of the Roman Catholic Diocese of Mansa. Zambia on February 28, 1974 and was ordained bishop on April 28, 1974. On December 3, 1990, Spaita was appointed archbishop of the Roman Catholic Archdiocese of Kasama, Zambia and retired on April 30, 2009.

Notes

1934 births
2014 deaths
Zambian Roman Catholic archbishops
People from Southern Province, Zambia
Roman Catholic bishops of Mansa
Roman Catholic archbishops of Kasama